Lake Cannon, an almost round lake, has a surface area of . Lake Cannon is in a highly urbanized area. On the north shore is a some vacant land and the Boys Club is also on the north shore. The rest of the lake is surrounded by residential areas.

The lake was first mapped by Dr. John Westcott for the United States government.  Dr. Westcott was a deeply religious man, and originally gave it the name Lake Canon.  However, the United States Army renamed it to Lake Cannon during the Seminole Wars.

There are no public boat ramps or swimming areas on Lake Cannon's shores. However, on the northeast shore, along East Lake Cannon Drive, is Lake Cannon Public Park. This park has picnic tables and a fishing dock. On the northwest shore, just south of the Boys Club, is a public boat ramp. Boats may reach Lake Cannon from four canals. One connects this lake to Mirror Lake, another connects it to Howard Lake, a third connects it to Lake Idylwild, to the north, and a fourth connects to Lake Blue, to the west. This lake is part of the south system of the Winter Haven Chain of Lakes, so it may be reached by boats coming from a number of public boat ramps in the system.  The Take Me Fishing website says Lake Cannon contains largemouth bass, bluegill and black crappie.

References

Cannon
Winter Haven, Florida